Alejandro Alagón Cano is a Mexican doctor, researcher, professor and academic. He was an active researcher during the development process of the world's first scorpion antivenom named Alacramyn. This antivenom was approved by the United States Food and Drug Administration (FDA) in 2011, and is marketed under the name Anascorp.

Education
He completed his undergraduate degree at the Faculty of Medicine of the National Autonomous University of Mexico (UNAM), later he completed a master's degree and a doctorate in biomedical research , at the same institution. He did postdoctoral studies at Rockefeller University in New York.

Later, he joined the faculty and researchers at the Institute of Biotechnology at his alma mater where he  has been coordinator of master's and doctoral programs in biochemical sciences and academic secretary at the Center for Research on Genetic Engineering and Biotechnology.

Awards and distinctions 

 National University Award (PUN) in the area of Innovation and Technology granted by the National Autonomous University of Mexico in 2004. 
 National Prize for Arts and Sciences (Mexico) award granted by the Secretariat of Public Education (Mexico) in 2005.
 Premio Luis Elizondo award granted by the Monterrey Institute of Technology and Higher Education in 2013

References

Mexican physicians
Mexican academics
National Autonomous University of Mexico alumni
Year of birth missing (living people)
Living people